Monthei Eriksen Haug (9 March 1861 – 9 June 1933) was a Norwegian politician for the Liberal Party.

He was born in Nordre Odalen. He served in the military and attended Sagatun folk high school before settling as a farmer. He was elected to Nordre Odalen municipal council in 1891, and served as mayor from 1895 to 1901. He was elected to the Norwegian Parliament in 1900, representing the constituency of Hedemarkens Amt, and was re-elected in 1904 and 1907. He had been a deputy representative during the term 1895–1897.

References

1861 births
1933 deaths
Members of the Storting
Liberal Party (Norway) politicians
Mayors of places in Hedmark